KooBits (stylised as KooBits with capitalised K and B) designs and builds digital products for children and educators. KooBits was founded in 2016 by current CEO Stanley, with Professor Sam Ge Shuzhi and Dr Chen Xiangdong. The trio saw an opportunity in the rapid growth of the ebook industry and decided to focus on creating software for interactive enhanced ebooks. Currently, KooBits is focused on education technology for primary mathematics learning.

History 
In 2017, KooBits was the winner  of the Asia Pacific ICT Awards 2008 (eLearning)  and the Infocomm Singapore Awards 2008 (eLearning).

KooBits received support from the Media Development Authority (MDA) in the development of Future Media  and was one of the companies selected to receive funding in Interactive Digital Media  projects. MDA also helped Personal e-Motion secure Venture Capital fund from Accel-X Pte Ltd. KooBits is part of the FutureBooks Partner Network initiated by MDA to develop Singapore-based learning from user-generated content to delivery across multiple platforms. PEM raised its first round of Venture Capital investments in July 2009 through NUS Enterprise ’s network of Business Angels and Venture Capitalists.

KooBits provides the platform for the creation of ebooks for Young Reporters Training Camp program of Youth Olympic Games 2010, an initiative by the Ministry of Information, Communications and the Arts (MICA), Singapore.

References 

Electronic publishing
Electronic paper technology
 Educational technology companies of Singapore
 Educational software